The 1990 Cronulla-Sutherland Sharks season was the 24th in the club's history. Coached by Allan Fitzgibbon and captained David Hatch, they competed in the NSWRL's 1990 Winfield Cup premiership. The Sharks finished the regular season in 10th place (out of 16), failing to reach the finals.

Ladder

References

Cronulla-Sutherland Sharks seasons
Cronulla-Sutherland Sharks season
Cronulla-Sutherland Sharks season